Matapeake may refer to:

Matapeake, Maryland, an unincorporated community located south of Stevensville on Kent Island, Maryland
 Matapeake people, a Native American tribe of eastern Maryland
Matapeake State Park, a state park managed by Queen Anne's County located in Matapeake, Maryland